Medusagraptus is a genus of dasycladalean green alga.

References

External links
 image

Ulvophyceae genera